Roland the Mighty is a 1956 Italian film directed by Pietro Francisci. about the Battle of Roncevaux Pass in AD 778, where Roland, a knight in the service of Charlemagne was killed while defending the rear-guard of the Frankish army as it retreated across the Pyrenees.

Plot 
Charlemagne and Agramante are at war. The Saracen king devises a plan to weaken the opponent: he asks for a truce and sends the beautiful Angelica to the Frankish Kingdom with the intent of sowing discord among the paladins by creating a rivalry of love.

Cast
 Rik Battaglia as Roland 
 Rosanna Schiaffino as Angélique
 Fabrizio Mioni as Renaud	 
 Lorella De Luca as Aude
 Ivo Garrani as Charlemagne		
 Cesare Fantoni as Agramante 	
 Clelia Matania as Mary
 Mimmo Palmara as Argalie	
 Vittorio Sanipoli as  Ganelon	
 Robert Hundar as Balicante	
 Rossella Como  as 	Dolores		 	
 Pietro Tordi as Ubaldo

Release
Roland the Mighty was released in Italy on 6 December 1956 with a 110-minute running time.

See also
 List of historical drama films

References

Bibliography

External links
 

Italian historical films
1950s historical films
1956 films
Films set in the 8th century
Films set in France
Works based on The Song of Roland
Cultural depictions of Charlemagne
Italian films based on actual events
Films based on the Matter of France
Films directed by Pietro Francisci
Films scored by Angelo Francesco Lavagnino
1950s Italian films